Diogo Alexandre de Almeida Mendes (born 24 January 1998) is a Portuguese professional footballer who plays as a midfielder for Marítimo.

Honours
Benfica
UEFA Youth League runner-up: 2016–17

References

External links

1998 births
Living people
People from Faro, Portugal
Portuguese footballers
Association football midfielders
Liga Portugal 2 players
S.L. Benfica B players
C.S. Marítimo players
Portugal youth international footballers
Sportspeople from Faro District